Carmela is a 1942 Italian drama film directed by Flavio Calzavara, starring Doris Duranti and Pál Jávor. It is set on a small island in the Strait of Sicily in 1893, and tells the story of a young woman who is seduced by a soldier who promises to marry her, only to be abandoned soon after. When a new soldier is stationed on the island she tries to convince him to make the first soldier return. The film is based on Edmondo De Amicis' 1869 short story "Vita Militare".

Cast
 Doris Duranti as Carmela Ferrari
 Pál Jávor as Il tenente Carlo Salvini
 Aldo Silvani as Il dottor Giulio Cavagnetti
 Egisto Olivieri as Il sindaco
 Anna Capodaglio as La madre di Carmela
 Bella Starace Sainati as Mamma Ada, la fattuchierra
 Enza Delbi as Teresita, la figlia del sindaco
 Lola Braccini as La moglie del sindaco

References

1942 drama films
1942 films
Films based on short fiction
Films based on works by Edmondo De Amicis
Films directed by Flavio Calzavara
Films set in 1893
Italian drama films
1940s Italian-language films
Italian black-and-white films
1940s Italian films